The leaders of the Russian Civil War listed below include the important political and military figures of the Russian Civil War. The conflict, fought largely from 7 November 1917 to 25 October 1922 (though with some conflicts in the Far East lasting until late 1923 and in Central Asia until 1934), was fought between numerous factions, the two largest being the Bolsheviks (The "Reds") and the White Movement (The "Whites"). While the Bolsheviks were centralized under the administration of the Russian Soviet Federative Socialist Republic and the  Russian Communist Party (Bolsheviks), led by Vladimir Lenin, along with their various  satellite and  buffer states, the White Movement was more decentralized, functioning as a loose confederation of anti-Bolshevik forces united only in opposition to their common enemy - though from September 1918 to April 1920, the White Armies were nominally united under the administration of the  Russian State, when, for nearly two years, Admiral Alexander Kolchak served as the overall head of the White Movement and as the  internationally recognized Head of State of Russia. In addition to the two primary factions, the war also involved a number of third parties, including the  anarchists of the Revolutionary Insurgent Army of Ukraine, and the non-ideological Green Armies.

Unlike the Bolsheviks and the White Movement, the various third-party factions which took part in the conflict did not form a united front and often fought against each other as much as they fought against the larger belligerents, occasionally forming alliances when convenient, and breaking them almost as often. For instance, the  Black Army fought alongside the Bolsheviks against the forces of Anton Denikin in South Russia, while the members of the Socialist-Revolutionary Party frequently cooperated with the White Army. A number of foreign nations also intervened against the Bolsheviks for various reasons, including the principal Allied Powers of World War I (in the Allied intervention in the Russian Civil War), and their German (in Ober Ost) and  Austro-Hungarian opponents. In addition, a number of  independence movements took the opportunity to break free from Russian control in the aftermath of the collapse of the Russian Empire, primarily fighting against the Bolsheviks, as well as against the White armies on occasion.

Bolsheviks

Russian SFSR

Central Executive Committee of the All-Russian Congress of Soviets Lev Kamenev Yakov Sverdlov #  Mikhail Vladimirsky Mikhail Kalinin

Council of People's Commissars Vladimir Lenin

All-Russian Extraordinary Commission Felix Dzerzhinsky Yakov Peters

Red Army Leon Trotsky(People's Commissar for Military and Naval Affairs)High Command: Vladimir Antonov-Ovseyenko Nikolai Podvoisky Pavel Dybenko Nikolai Krylenko Jukums Vācietis Sergey Kamenev Alexander Svechin Mikhail Bonch-Bruyevich Nikolay RattelNavy: Vasili Altfater #  Yevgeny Berens Aleksandr Nemits Eduard Pantserzhanskiy Fyodor Raskolnikov Alexey SchastnyAir Service: Konstantin Akashev1st Cavalry Army: Semyon Budyonny Alexander Yegorov Kliment Voroshilov Iosif Apanasenko Grigory Kulik Alexander Parkhomenko Boris Dumenko Konstantin Trunov Aleksa Dundić Semyon Timoshenko Ivan Tyulenev Jefim Szczadienko2nd Cavalry Army: Oka Gorodovikov Filipp Mironov Aleksandr BorczaninowWestern Army: Andrei Snesarev Alexander Novikov Vasily Glagolev Nikolai Sollogub Alexander Kuk Yevgeny ShilovskyLatvian Riflemen: Pēteris Stučka Frīdrihs Kalniņš Jānis Lācis Reinholds Bērziņš Antons Martusēvičs Kirill Stutzka Gustavs Mangulis Eduard Berzin Jānis JudiņšRed Cossacks: Vitaly PrimakovEastern Front: Mikhail Muravyov Mikhail Tukhachevsky Alexander Samoylo Vladimir Olderogge Rudolf Sivers Sergey Lazo Yakov Tryapitsyn Pavel Lebedev Hayk Bzhishkyan Vasily Chapayev Ivan Kutyakov Yakov Korotayev Sergei Mezheninov Yan Gamarnik Ivar Smilga Ivan Smirnov Sergey Gusev Filipp Goloshchekin Mikhail Alafuso Ivan Strod Pavel Khokhryakov Mullanur WaxitovSouthern Front: Joseph Stalin Mikhail Levandovsky Vladimir Yegoryev Vladimir Gittis Vladimir Azin Pavel Sytin Pēteris Slavens #  Vladimir Selivachyov #  Semyon Pugachov Fyodor Podtelkov Iona Yakir Ivan Fedko Dmitry Zhloba Nikolay Kuibyshev Mikhail Lashevich Béla KunCaucasus Front: Sergo Ordzhonikidze Stepan Shaumian Grigory Korganov Ivan Sorokin Alexei Avtonomov #  Anatoliy Gekker Valentin Trifonov Mikhail Velikanov Filipp Makharadze Sergei Kirov Nariman NarimanovNorthern Front: Dmitry Nadyozhny August Kork Dmitri Parsky #  Semyon Nakhimson Yuri GuzarskyUkrainian Front: Nikolay Shchors Ivan Dubovoy Stanislav Kosior Grigory Kotovsky Nikolai Krivoruchko Anton Słucki Boris ShaposhnikovCentral Asian Front: Mikhail Frunze Grigori Sokolnikov Vasily Shorin Pyotr Kobozev Ivan Belov Alibi Dzhangildin Amangeldy Imanov Fyodor Kolesov Shalva Eliava Fayzulla Khodzhayev

Far Eastern Republic

 Alexander Krasnoshchyokov Nikolay Matveyev Genrich Eiche Vasily Blyukher Konstantin Avksentevsky Ieronim Uborevich Stepan Vostretsov Yakiv Pokus

Ukrainian SSR

 Yukhym Medvedev Volodymyr Zatonsky Grigory Petrovsky Georgy Pyatakov Serafima Hopner Emanuel Kviring Yevgenia Bosch Mykola Skrypnyk Christian Rakovsky Vasyl Shakhrai Yuriy Kotsiubynsky Fyodor Sergeyev

Byelorussian SSR

 Vilhelm Knorin Alexander Chervyakov

Finnish Socialist Workers' Republic

 Kullervo Manner Yrjö Sirola Ali Aaltonen Eero Haapalainen Evert Eloranta Adolf Taimi Eino Rahja August Wesley Mikhail Svechnikov Georgy Bulatsel

Mongolian People's Revolutionary Party

 Damdin Sükhbaatar Soliin Danzan Tseren-Ochiryn Dambadorj Dambyn Chagdarjav Dogsomyn Bodoo Khorloogiin Choibalsan Dansranbilegiin Dogsom Darizavyn Losol Rinchingiin Elbegdorj

White Movement

Russian State

 Alexander Kolchak(Supreme Ruler of Russia) Pyotr Vologodsky Viktor Pepelyayev Mikhail Smirnov Vasily BoldyrevNorthwestern Army: Nikolai Yudenich(Commander-in-Chief) Anton Dzerozhinsky Alexander Rodzyanko Peter von Glasenapp Alexei Vandam Fyodor Keller Anatol von Lieven Pavel Bermondt-Avalov Aleksandr DolgorukovNorthern Army: Yevgeny Miller(Commander-in-Chief) Vladimir Marushevsky Mikhail Kvetsinsky Nikolai TchaikovskyArctic Ocean Flotilla: Leonid Ivanov Boris VilkitskyArmed Forces of South Russia: Anton Denikin(Commander-in-Chief) Vladimir May-Mayevsky #  Nikołaj Timanowski #  Ivan Romanovsky Alexander Lukomsky Dmitry Shcherbachev Mikhail Drozdovsky Nikolai Tretyakov Ignatiy Vasilchenko Viktor Betling #  Mikhail Rodzianko Nikołaj Bredow Abram Dragomirov Vladimir Dragomirov Vasily Flug Konstantin Prisovskiy Alexander Golubintzev Yakov Yuzefovich Pavel Chatilov Viktor PokrovskyBlack Sea Flotilla: Vasily Kanin Mikhail Sablin #  Dmitry Nenyukov Andrei Pokrovsky Nikolay MaksimovTurkestan Army: Ippolit Savitsky Boris Kazanovich Konstantin Osipov Konstantin MonstrovArmy of Wrangel: Pyotr Wrangel(Commander-in-Chief) Alexander Krivoshein Vladimir Vitkovsky Alexander Kutepov Petr Makhrov Ivan Barbovich Alexander Borovsky Mikhail Fostikov Nikolai ShillingWrangel's Fleet: Mikhail KedrovPeople's Army of Komuch: Vladimir Kappel #  Andrei Bakich Konstantin Nechaev Sergey LyupovSiberian Army: Aleksey Grishin-Almazov Pavel Ivanov-Rinov Alexey Matkovsky Vladimir Gulidov Boris Annenkov Konstantin Sakharov Mikhail PleshkovUral Army: Matvey Martynov Vladimir Akutin Nikolay Saveliev Vladimir TolstovOrenburg Independent Army: Alexander Dutov Ivan AkulininAmur Front: Ivan KalmykovWomen's Battalion: Maria BochkarevaSiberian Flotilla: Sergey Timirev Mikhail Berens Georgy Stark

Volunteer Army

 Lavr Kornilov(Commander-in-Chief) Mikhail Alekseyev #  Sergey Markov Dmitri Miontxinski Mitrofan Nejentsev Vasily Simanovsky

Don Army District

 Alexey Kaledin Anatoly Nazarov Vasily Tchernetzov

Don Republic

 Pyotr Krasnov Afrikan BogaevskyGreat Don Army: Svyatoslav Denisov Vladimir Sidorin Pyotr Popov Ivan Popov Konstantin Mamontov #  Alexander Fitzchelaurov Fyodor Kryukov #  Emmanuel Semiletov #  Georgiy Kargalskov Aleksandr Moller Mikhail Bazavov Mikhail Khripunov Isaak Bykadorov Konstantin Sychev

Kuban People's Republic

 Alexander Filimonov Nikolay BukretovKuban Army: Andrei Shkuro Yakov Slashchov Sergei Ulagay

Far Eastern Army

 Grigory Semyonov(Commander-in-Chief) Sergey Rozanov Boris Khreschatitsky Nikolai Lokhvitsky Grigory Verzhbitsky Konstantin Akintievsky Dmitry Semyonov Anatoly Pepelyayev Lev Vlasyevskiy Mikhail Pleshkov Georgy Matsievsky Mikhail KorobeinikovAsiatic Cavalry Division: Roman Ungern-Sternberg Boris Rezukhin

Provisional Priamurye Government

 Mikhail Diterikhs - (Commander-in-Chief)  - Foreign Minister  - Chairman Viktorin Molchanov - Army General Innokentiy Smolin Faddey Glebov Pyotr Blokhin

Czechoslovak Legion

 Sergei Wojciechowski Radola Gajda Jan Syrový Stanislav Čeček Vladimir Shokorov

Alash Autonomy

 Alikhan Bukeikhanov

Turkestan Autonomy

 Mukhamedzhan Tynyshpaev Mustafa Shokay

Third party factions

Insurgent Army

 Nestor Makhno Semen Karetnyk Fedir Shchus Dmitry Popov Maria Nikiforova Viktor Bilash Lev Zadov Ivan Markov Iuda Grossman Oleksiy Chubenko

Green Army

 Nykyfor Hryhoriv Danylo Terpylo Pjotr Tokmakov Alexander Antonov Dmitry Antonov Ivan Kolesov Efim Mamontov Mikhail Kozyr Konstantin Voskoboinik

Socialist-Revolutionary Party

 Vladimir Volsky Nikolai Avksentiev Viktor Chernov Fyodor Funtikov Vladimir Zenzinov Andrei Argunov Piotr Derber Yevgeny Rogovskiy Boris Savinkov Boris Donskoy

Left Socialist-Revolutionary Party
 Maria Spiridonova Yakov Blumkin Boris Kamkov Mark Natanson #  Dmitry Ivanovich Popov Mikhail Artemyevich Muravyov Prosh Proshian #

Kronstadt Uprising

 Stepan Petrichenko Alexander Kozlovsky Pavel Vilken

Independence movements

Polish Republic

 Józef Piłsudski Ignacy Jan PaderewskiPolish Army: Edward Rydz-Śmigły Lucjan Żeligowski Leonard Skierski Władysław Sikorski Jordan-Rozwadowski Franciszek Latinik Bolesław RojaBlue Army: Józef Haller

Kingdom of Finland

 C.G.E. Mannerheim Pehr Evind Svinhufvud Karl Fredrik Wilkama Hannes Ignatius Ernst Linder Ernst Löfström Martin Wetzer Hjalmar Frisell Hans Kalm

Latvia

 Jānis Čakste Kārlis Ulmanis Oskars Kalpaks Jānis Balodis

Estonia

 Konstantin Päts Andres Larka Johan Laidoner Ernst Põdder

Lithuania

 Antanas Smetona Aleksandras Stulginskis Silvestras Žukauskas

Belarusian People's Republic

 Jan Sierada Pyotra Krecheuski Jazep Losik Vaclau Lastouski Kyprian Kandratovich Kastuś Jezavitaŭ Anton Luckievich Alés Harun #  Francišak Kušal Paval Zhauryd Bułak-Bałachowicz

Crimean People's Republic

 Noman Çelebicihan Cafer Qırımer

Democratic Republic of Georgia

 Noe Ramishvili Noe Zhordania Giorgi Kvinitadze Nikolay Chkheidze Giorgi Mazniashvili

Democratic Republic of Armenia

 Aram Manukian #  Hovhannes Kajaznuni Alexander Khatisian Hamo Ohanjanyan Simon Vratsian Tovmas Nazarbekian Andranik Ozanian Garegin Nzhdeh Drastamat Kanayan Movses Silikyan

Democratic Republic of Azerbaijan

 Mammad Amin Rasulzadeh Fatali Khan Khoyski Nasib Yusifbeyli Mammad Hasan Hajinski Khosrow Sultanov Samad Mehmandarov

Ukrainian People's Republic

Central Council of Ukraine: Mykhailo HrushevskyDirectorate of Ukraine: Volodymyr Vynnychenko Symon PetliuraUkrainian Army: Mykola Porsh Ivan Nemolovsky Oleksandr Zhukovsky Petro Bolbochan Zurab Natiev Oleksander Hrekov Vsevolod Petriv Yevhen Konovalets Mykola Yunakiv Volodymyr Salsky Oleksandr Udovychenko Mykola Kapustiansky Sergei Delwig Iwan Omelianowicz-Pawlenko Yuriy Tyutyunnyk Vasyl Tyutyunnyk # Galician Army: Myron Tarnavsky Mykhailo Omelianovych-Pavlenko Osip Mikitka Dmytro Vitovsky Antin Kraws Archduke WilhelmUkrainian Navy: Sviatoslav Shramchenko Wołodymyr Sawczenko-Bilski Mikhail BelinskyFar Eastern Ukrainian Army: Yuri Hlushko-Mova

Ukrainian State

 Pavlo Skoropadskyi Alexander Ragoza

Emirate of Bukhara

 Mohammed Alim Khan

Khanate of Khiva

 Isfandiyar Khan Sayid Abdullah Junaid Khan

Basmachi Movement

 Enver Pasha Selim Pasha Ibrahim Bek Muhiddinbek Mandamin Bek Irgash Bey Faizal Maksum

Mongolia

 Bogd Khan

Allied Expeditionary Forces

United States

 William S. Graves George E. Stewart Robert L. Eichelberger

British Empire

 Edmund Ironside Alfred Knox Frederick Poole Wilfrid Malleson Frederick Bailey Lionel Dunsterville James H. Elmsley

France

 Maurice Janin Louis d'Espèrey Henri Berthelot Philippe d'Anselme

Empire of Japan

 Otani Kikuzo Yui Mitsue

Greece

 Konstantinos Nider

Romania

 Ernest Broșteanu

Central Powers intervention

German Empire

 Paul von Hindenburg Erich Ludendorff Max Hoffmann Rüdiger von Goltz Hermann von Eichhorn Robert Kosch Friedrich von Kressenstein Alfred Fletcher Josef Bischoff Walter von Eberhardt

Austria-Hungary

 Conrad von Hötzendorf A. A. von Straußenburg

Ottoman Empire

 Nuri Pasha Mürsel Bey Kâzım Karabekir Cevat Çobanlı Muzaffer Kılıç

References

Russian Civil War
People of the Russian Civil War